Philip Jerald Singleton (born December 14, 1981) is an American politician from Georgia. Singleton is a Republican member of Georgia House of Representatives for District 71.

Personal life 
Singleton's wife is Julie Singleton. They have four children. Singleton and his family live in Atlanta, Georgia.

Politics 
Singleton's political views can be described as Alt-Right. He has authored bills on illegal immigration, constitutional carry, and in 2021 Singleton introduced Georgia House Bill 276 banning biological males from participating in women's high school sports. He is a strong supporter of Voter ID Laws. Singleton has also used social media to claim that President of the United States Joe Biden’s administration is akin to that of former German Chancellor Adolf Hitler due to the former’s use of government mandates of COVID-19 vaccines.

References

External links 
 Philip Singleton at ballotpedia.org

Republican Party members of the Georgia House of Representatives
21st-century American politicians
Living people
1981 births